This is a list of all games released on cartridge for the Atari Jaguar, a fifth generation home video game console developed by Flare Technology and manufactured by IBM for Atari Corporation. The following list does not include games for the system's only add-on, the Jaguar CD.

Unveiled at the August's 1993 Chicago Consumer Entertainment Show, it was first released on November 23, 1993 in the test markets of New York City and San Francisco, and then in April 1994 for the rest of North America. The fifth (and final) home console under the Atari name, the Jaguar was marketed as the world's first 64-bit video game system, although its GPU and DSP processors were actually 32-bit based.

Atari released and marketed the Jaguar to compete with 16-bit consoles such as the Sega Genesis and Super Nintendo Entertainment System and 32-bit systems such as the 3DO Interactive Multiplayer (which launched the same year), Amiga CD32 and Philips CD-i. The system's crippled multi-chip architecture that was difficult for most developers to program games for it, combined with Atari's severely limited financial resources and poor commercial performance in the market, resulted in a limited library of only 44 titles released in cartridge format during its official commercial run. Fewer than 250,000 units were sold; sales of the Jaguar virtually plummeted in 1995 when the respective launches of the Sega Saturn and Sony PlayStation began outselling the console. Originally released at US$249.99, Atari dropped the price to $149.99 in 1995 for a few months before being dropped again to $99.99 in order to clear out the remaining inventory. The Jaguar struggled to maintain a substantial userbase during most of its life and by early 1996, the system and game development for it were discontinued; 6 more official games came out for the Jaguar at that point.

On February 13, 1996, Atari agreed to merge with JTS, Inc. in a reverse takeover, which would later take effect on July 30, and on April 12, 1996, the company filed a 10-K405 SEC Filing. After Hasbro Interactive acquired all the Atari assets in 1998, the Jaguar's patents were released into the public domain, declaring it an open platform and allowing anyone to freely create and publish software for the Jaguar without obtaining a license from Hasbro. Since May 14, 1999, when the announcement was made, the Jaguar continues to enjoy a cult following with a slew of homebrew games being developed and released.

Games 
Listed here are all  officially released Atari Jaguar cartridge games.

See also 
 List of Atari Jaguar homebrew games
 List of cancelled Atari Jaguar games
 Lists of video games

Notes

References

External links 
 List of Atari Jaguar games at MobyGames

Atari Jaguar